Ranongga is an island located in the New Georgia Islands group of Western Province, Solomon Islands.

History
Ranongga was sighted in 1787 by sailors Read and Dale.

On August 18, 1959, a seismic sea wave was generated off the west coast of Ranongga Island, at 08 hr 05 min. Soon after, large waves were observed in Vori, on the northern coast of the island. The sea receded by 15m and then returned to its original position. In May 2007 there was another large earthquake, and tsunami, and the whole Island lifted out of the sea by 3 meters, and stayed there, exposing all of the reefs around the Island, making life very hard for the locals for some time after.

Geography
The highest point is Mt. Kela (869m)

2007 earthquake

In April 2007, an earthquake rocked Ranongga Island, along with many parts of the Solomon Islands. Land thrust from the quake extended out the shoreline of Ranongga Island by up to 70 meters (230 ft) according to local residents. This has left many once pristine coral reefs exposed on the newly formed beaches.

Demographics
Most of the villages are situated on the eastern side of the island. The Ghanongga language is spoken by about 2500 people on Ranongga Island.

References

Islands of the Solomon Islands
Western Province (Solomon Islands)